Mehrestan (also Romanized as Zābolī; also known as Qal‘eh-ye Zābolī – "Fort Zaboli"; formerly, Magas) is a city in and the capital of Mehrestan County, Sistan and Baluchestan Province, Iran. When its 2006 census was conducted, its population was 7,672, in 1,560 families.

References

Mehrestan County
Cities in Sistan and Baluchestan Province